is a town located in Sennan District, Osaka Prefecture, Japan. , the town had an estimated population of 8,492 in 4010 households and a population density of 1500 persons per km2.

Geography 
Tajiri is located at the southwestern tip of Osaka Prefecture, facing Osaka Bay. The central portion of Kansai International Airport is located in the town boundary. It is the smallest town in Japan in terms of geographic area.

Neighboring municipalities
Osaka Prefecture
Izumisano
Sennan

Climate
Tajiri has a Humid subtropical climate (Köppen Cfa) characterized by warm summers and cool winters with light to no snowfall.

Demographics
Per Japanese census data, the population of Tajiri has been fluctuating over the past  50 years.

History
The area of the modern town of Tajiri was within ancient Izumi Province. During the Edo Period, the area was divided between the holdings of Kishiwada Domain and Mikami Domain. The village of Tajiri was established within Hine District of Osaka Prefecture with the creation of the modern municipalities system on April 1, 1889. On  April 1, 1896, the area became part of Sennan District, Osaka. Tajiri was raised to town status on May 3, 1953

Government
Tajiri has a mayor-council form of government with a directly elected mayor and a unicameral city council of 10 members. Tajiri collectively with the cities of Kaizuka, Sennan, and Hannan contributes two members to the Osaka Prefectural Assembly. In terms of national politics, the town is part of Osaka 19th district of the lower house of the Diet of Japan.

Economy
The economy of Tajiri is centered on commercial fishing, agriculture and textiles. Due to the proximity to Kansai International Airport, aviation-related support industries are also located in the town. At one time Peach Aviation had its headquarters in a location that was on the airport property and in the town.

Education
Tajiri has one public elementary school and one public middle school operated by the town government. The town does not have a high school.

Transportation

Railway 
 Nankai Electric Railway -   Nankai Main Line
 
 Nankai Electric Railway -   Nankai Airport Line
  
 JR West – Kansai Airport Line

Highway

Local attractions
Tajiri Historic House

Gallery

References

External links

Tajiri official website 

Towns in Osaka Prefecture
Populated coastal places in Japan
Tajiri, Osaka